Ruzhdie is a village and a former municipality in the Fier County, southwestern Albania. At the 2015 local government reform it became a subdivision of the municipality Patos. The population at the 2011 census was 2,326. In May 2010 it came to prominence in Albania as the hottest spot in a vote recount of the elections.

References

Former municipalities in Fier County
Administrative units of Patos (municipality)
Villages in Fier County